Layia is a genus of flowering plants in the family Asteraceae known generally as tidy tips, native to western North America. Several are California endemics.

These are erect daisylike annual herbs with dark glandular stems. The flower heads usually contain white or yellow ray florets; some species have yellow florets tipped sharply in white which give the flowers their common name. The genus is named for naturalist George Tradescant Lay, who was one of the discoverers of Layia gaillardioides.

 Species

References

External links
 CalFlora Database: Layia — with species images and links.
 Jepson Manual Treatment — Layia
 USDA Plants Profile: Layia
 

 
Asteraceae genera
Flora of North America